Chase Secondary School is a public high school in Chase, British Columbia part of School District 73 Kamloops/Thompson.

Chase Secondary is a small community school nestled in the small town of Chase in the rolling hills of interior of British Columbia, Canada. Chase Secondary has about two hundred and seventy students enrolled through grades eight to twelve.

High schools in British Columbia
Thompson Country
Educational institutions in Canada with year of establishment missing